Defending champion Anna Danilina and her partner Anna-Lena Friedsam defeated Katarzyna Kawa and Alicja Rosolska in the final, 6–4, 5–7, [10–5] to win the doubles tennis title at the 2022 WTA Poland Open.

Danilina and Lidziya Marozava were the reigning champions, but Marozava did not participate.

Seeds

Draw

Draw

References

External links
Main draw

2022 WTA Tour
2022 WTA Poland Open - 2